ICZ may refer to:

-icz, Polish for "son of"; see Family name affixes
iCZ technology, used in Babicz Guitars
Indolocarbazole
International Congress of Zookeepers
International Construction Zimbabwe, division of Murray & Roberts; see Manyuchi Dam
Israelitische Cultusgemeinde Zürich (ICZ), the largest Jewish community of Switzerland